Xırmandalı (also, Kharmandali, Kharmandaly, and Khyrmandaly) is a village and municipality in the Masally Rayon of Azerbaijan.  It has a population of 3,745.

Khirmandaly is a populated place in the region of Masally, the country of Azerbaijan with an average elevation of -5 meter below sea level. The area is mildly densely populated with 221 people per km2 . The nearest town larger than 50,000 inhabitants takes about 1:02 hour by local transportation.

Khirmandaly is in a very strong (vii) earthquake zone, with occurrences of earthquakes at 6-7 Richter. When a strong earthquake occurs, it will be difficult to stand and noticed by people driving motor cars. Furniture and glass will be broken. The damage will be negligible in buildings of good design and construction but considerable damage may be inflicted on poorly built or badly designed structures. There is a medium-high occurrence of periods with extreme drought. Flooding risk is low.

Weather 

August is warmest with an average temperature of 30.9 °C at noon. January is coldest with an average temperature of 0 °C at night. Khirmandaly has distinct cold and warm seasons, like cold winters and warm summers. The temperatures at night are cooler than during daytime.

Winter has prolonged freezing periods, with the coldest month most often being January. July is on average the month with most sunshine. Rainfall and other precipitation has no distinct peak month. Usually a clear night sky is not polluted by light from unnatural sources, it makes looking at stars easy at night.

Time zone 

Asia/Baku 
Time zone	AZT (UTC+4)
- Summer (DST)	AZT (UTC+5)

Nature 

Khirmandaly has a humid (> 0.65 p/pet) climate. The land area is cultivated, still some natural vegetation is preserved. The landscape is mostly covered with mosaic croplands/vegetation. The climate is classified as a mediterranean (mild with dry, hot summer), with a warm temperate dry forest biozone . The soil in the area is high in calcisols, cambisols, luvisols (cl), soils dominated by calcium carbonate as powdery lime or concretions.
Landscape in Khirmandalı Matthews
Vegetation Zone	
Xeromorphic Shrubland/Dwarf Shrubland
Holdridge
Bioclimatic Zone 	
Warm Temperate Dry Forest
Soil Type 	
Calcisols, Cambisols, Luvisols (CL), soils dominated by calcium carbonate as powdery lime or concretions.
Malaria Occurrence 	No malaria

References 

Populated places in Masally District